Hudnut, also known as Clinton Locks, is an unincorporated community in western Florida Township, Parke County, in the U.S. state of Indiana, just east of Clinton.

History
A post office called Hudnut was established in 1887, and remained in operation until it was discontinued in 1893. The community derives its name from the firm of Hudnut and Company, which owned property on the Wabash and Erie Canal.

Geography

References

Unincorporated communities in Indiana
Unincorporated communities in Parke County, Indiana